The  (English: 2nd Premier league Southwest) was the second-highest level of the German football league system in the southwest of Germany from 1951 until the formation of the Bundesliga in 1963. It covered the two states of Rhineland-Palatinate and Saarland.

Overview
The  was formed in 1951 as a feeder league to the Oberliga Südwest which had been operating from 1945. It was the last of the three second Oberligas, the other two being 2. Oberliga West (1949) and 2. Oberliga Süd (1950).

The winners and runners-up of this league were promoted to the Oberliga Südwest, the bottom two teams relegated to the Amateurligas. Below the 2. Oberliga were the following Amateurligas:
Rheinland (split into two groups from 1956 to 1963)
Saarland
Südwest

The TSC Zweibrücken was the only club to play all twelve seasons in the league.

Disbanding of the 2. Oberliga
In 1963 the league was dissolved. Six of its clubs went to the new Regionalliga Südwest, the new second division. The other ten teams were relegated to the Amateurligas.

The following teams were admitted to the new Regionalliga:
Phönix Ludwigshafen
Eintracht Trier
SpVgg Weisenau
Phönix Bellheim
SV Röchling Völklingen
TSC Zweibrücken

The following teams were relegated to the Amateurliga:
Saarland: SC Friedrichsthal, SV Ludweiler, VfB Theley, SV St. Ingbert
Rheinland: VfB Wissen, Germania Metternich, FV Engers 07
Südwest: FV Speyer, FSV Schifferstadt, BFV Hassia Bingen

Winners and runners-up of the 2. Oberliga Südwest
The winners and runners-up of the league:

Placings in the 2. Oberliga Südwest 
The league placings from 1951 to 1963:

Source:

Key

References

Sources
 Kicker Almanach,  The yearbook on German football from Bundesliga to Oberliga, since 1937, published by the Kicker Sports Magazine
 Süddeutschlands Fussballgeschichte in Tabellenform 1897-1988  History of Southern German football in tables, publisher & author: Ludolf Hyll
 100 Jahre Süddeutscher Fussball-Verband  100-year-anniversary book of Southern German football Association, publisher: Vindelica Verlag, published: 1997
 Die Deutsche Liga-Chronik 1945-2005  History of German football from 1945 to 2005 in tables, publisher: DSFS, published: 2006

External links
 Das deutsche Fussball Archiv  Historic German league tables
 Oberliga Südwest at Fussballdaten.de

Defunct Oberligas (football)
Football competitions in Rhineland-Palatinate
Football competitions in Saarland
1951 establishments in West Germany
1963 disestablishments in Germany
Sports leagues established in 1951
Ger